Goodnight and God Bless is a British television sitcom which first aired on ITV in 1983. It is based around the life of popular television quiz host Ronnie Kemp, whose staff and father-in-law hate him.

Actors who appeared in episodes of the series include Lisa Daniely, George A. Cooper, Leslie Grantham, Nat Jackley, Gwen Taylor, Jean Boht, Constance Chapman and Lloyd Lamble.

Main cast
 Donald Churchill as Ronnie Kemp
 Judy Loe as Celia Kemp
 James Cossins as  Geoffrey
 Nick Stringer as  Harry
 Tracey Perry as  Debbie
 Rowena Cooper as Audrey

References

Bibliography
 Jerry Roberts. Encyclopedia of Television Film Directors. Scarecrow Press, 2009.

External links
 

1983 British television series debuts
1983 British television series endings
1980s British comedy television series
ITV sitcoms
Television series by ITV Studios
Television shows produced by Central Independent Television
English-language television shows